Carol Anne Hughes (born February 14, 1961) is a British-born American writer of children's and young adult novels. She has written about magic, pirates and princesses.

Carol Hughes lives in London with her husband and daughters.

Writer

Hughes wanted to be an actor as a schoolgirl, and she went to art college, but on both occasions she found herself writing stories instead.

Books
Jack Black and the Ship of Thieves (1997) – Publishers Weekly said of this book: "With a swashbuckling style and an imagination in overdrive, Hughes ... grabs readers on page one and never lets go." and "Entertaining from start to finish." On the other hand, Kirkus Reviews observed that "there's little of the imaginative flair that characterizes the novels this models: the science fantasies of Jules Verne and Philip Pullman." The Kirkus reviewer of Toots Underground remarked positively on Jack Black one year later, quoted below. 
Dirty Magic (2006)
The Princess and the Unicorn (2009)

Toots series
Toots and the Upside-Down House (1996) 
Toots Upside Down Again (1998)
Toots Underwater (1999)
Toots Underground (2001)

Notes

References

External links
 
  (previous page of browse report, some of those under 'Hughes, Carol' without '1955–')
 
 
 
WARNING: As of May 2015, the Library of Congress and WorldCat record for Carol Hughes are incoherent (more information above).

Living people
1955 births
American children's writers
American writers of young adult literature